The Association of Social Anthropologists of the UK and Commonwealth is a learned society in the United Kingdom dedicated to promoting the academic discipline of social anthropology. It is a member of the Academy of Social Sciences.

References

External links
 

Learned societies of the United Kingdom
Academic organisations based in the United Kingdom
Social sciences organizations
Scholarly communication